Nadja Bergknecht is a retired German swimmer who won a gold medal in the 4×200 m freestyle relay at the 1986 World Aquatics Championships, setting a new world record.

References

Living people
German female freestyle swimmers
German female swimmers
World Aquatics Championships medalists in swimming
Year of birth missing (living people)